Gary Lineker's Superstar Soccer is a computer game released in 1987 for the Amstrad CPC, Commodore 64 and ZX Spectrum, published by Gremlin Interactive in Europe, and by Mindscape as Superstar Soccer in the USA.

Gameplay
Superstar Soccer is an arcade action soccer simulation game. The player controls one player at a time. In addition to taking the role of the centre forward, the player is also the manager of the team, responsible for hiring players and setting training regimes.

Reception

The game was reviewed in 1988 in Dragon #132 by Hartley, Patricia, and Kirk Lesser in "The Role of Computers" column. The reviewers gave the game 3 out of 5 stars.

Zzap!64 magazine awarded the game 74%, describing it as "a pleasant and well-produced football game that is very playable, even if it isn't that true-to-life."

Reviews
ACE (Advanced Computer Entertainment) – February 1988, 739 out of 1,000 (74)
Tilt – February 1988, 13 out of 20 (65)
Your Sinclair – February 1988,	6 out of 10 (60)
ASM (Aktueller Software Markt) – December 1987

See also
 Gary Lineker

References

External links
Superstar Soccer at GameFAQs
Superstar Soccer  at GameSpot

1987 video games
Amstrad CPC games
Association football management video games
Association football video games
Commodore 64 games
Lineker
Lineker
Gremlin Interactive games
Mindscape games
Multiplayer and single-player video games
Video games based on real people
Video games developed in the United Kingdom
ZX Spectrum games